In molecular biology, Circular RNAs (circRNAs) refer to a class of circular RNA molecules found across all kingdoms of life. 
Studies in 2013 have suggested that circRNAs play important regulatory roles in miRNA activity. Researchers found that CDR1as circRNA acts as a miR-7 super-sponge that contains about 70 target sites from the same miR-7 at the same transcript. The other testis-specific circRNA, sex-determining region Y (Sry), also was found as a miR-138 sponge. About-mentioned examples suggesting that miRNA sponge effects achieved by circRNA formation may be a general phenomenon.
As miR-7 modulates the expression of several oncogenes, ciRS-7/miR-7 interactions may play an important roles in cancer-related pathways. circRNA has also been shown in viral infection where it sequesters anti-viral protein to enhance viral replication.

This Circular RNA (circRNA) databases and resources is a compilation of databases and web portals and servers used for circRNAs.

References 

RNA
LncRNA
Biological databases